The 1995 ATP Buenos Aires was an Association of Tennis Professionals tennis tournament held in Buenos Aires, Argentina on outdoor clay courts. It was the 24th edition of the tournament and was held from 6 November though 13 November 1995. Carlos Moyà won the singles title

Finals

Singles

 Carlos Moyà defeated  Felix Mantilla 6–0, 6–3 
It was Carlos Moyà's first ever career title.

Doubles

 Vincent Spadea /  Christo van Rensburg defeated  Jiří Novák /  David Rikl 6–3, 6–3 
 It was Spadea's only title of the year and the 1st of his career. It was van Rensburg's only title of the year and the 20th of his career.

References

External links 
 Association of Tennis Professionals (ATP) tournament profile

 
Topper South American Open Tennis Championships
ATP Buenos Aires
November 1995 sports events in South America